David Kerr (born May 4, 1945) is an American former politician who spent two decades as a Republican in the Kansas State Senate.

Born in the town of Pratt, Kerr grew up in Coats, Kansas and attended the University of Kansas, where he received his M.B.A. After working internationally for Trans-World Airlines, he returned to Kansas and successfully ran for the 34th Senate district in 1984.

Kerr spent the next two decades serving in the Senate. He eventually rose to become chairman of the Ways and Means Committee, as well as serving as president of the Senate from 2001 to 2004. In 2002, he sought the GOP nomination for governor, but didn't win the primary election. He declined to run for reelection in 2004.

References

Republican Party Kansas state senators
20th-century American politicians
21st-century American politicians
Politicians from Hutchinson, Kansas
1945 births
Living people
People from Pratt, Kansas
University of Kansas alumni